The charge at Krojanty, battle of Krojanty, the riding of Krojanty or skirmish of Krojanty was a Polish cavalry charge on the evening of 1 September 1939, the first day of the Second World War, near the Pomeranian village of Krojanty. It occurred at the start of the invasion of Poland and was part of the larger Battle of Tuchola Forest. Polish soldiers advanced east along the railway to a railroad crossroads  from the town of Chojnice, where elements of the Polish cavalry charged and dispersed a German infantry battalion. Machine gun fire from German armoured cars that appeared from a nearby forest forced the Poles to retreat. However, the attack delayed the German advance, allowing the Polish 1st Rifle Battalion and Czersk Operational Group to withdraw safely.

The incident prompted false reports of Polish cavalry attacking German tanks, after journalists saw the bodies of horses and cavalrymen. Nazi propaganda took advantage to suggest that the Poles attacked intentionally since they had believed the Germans still had the dummy tanks permitted by the Versailles Treaty's restrictions. The scene of the Polish cavalry charging panzers with lances remains a common myth.

Before the battle 
Polish units were engaged in battle from 05:00 against elements of German 76th Infantry Regiment (Colonel Hans Gollnick) of 20th Motorised Division under Lt. Gen. Mauritz von Wiktorin, which operated on the left (northern) flank of XIX Panzer Corps under Gen. Heinz Guderian. Early in the day, Polish cavalry had intercepted German infantry moving towards the Free City of Danzig (Gdańsk) and slowed their progress.

At 08:00, the Germans broke through Polish Border Guard units south of the Polish cavalry, which forced the Polish units in the area to start a retreat towards a secondary defence line at the Brda river. The 18th Pomeranian Uhlan Regiment was ordered to cover the retreat.

The battle 

The 18th Pomeranian Uhlans spotted a group of German infantry resting in a clearing in the Tuchola Forest heath near the railroad crossroads of Chojnice–Runowo Pomorskie line.

Colonel Kazimierz Mastalerz decided to take the enemy by surprise and ordered Eugeniusz Świeściak, commander of the 1st squadron, to execute a cavalry charge at 1900 hours, leading two squadrons, about 250 strong. Most of the two other squadrons, and their TKS/TK3 tankettes, were held back in reserve.

The charge was successful: the German infantry unit was dispersed, and the Poles occupied the clearing. However, German armored reconnaissance vehicles appeared from the forest road, probably part of Aufklärungs-Abteilung 20, and soon the Polish units came under heavy machine gun fire, probably from Leichter Panzerspähwagen equipped with MG 34, or Schwerer Panzerspähwagen equipped also with a 20 mm gun. The Poles were completely exposed and began to gallop for cover behind a nearby hillock.

Commander Świeściak was killed, as was Mastalerz, who tried to save him. About a third of the Polish force was dead or wounded. On the other hand, the German advance was halted long enough to allow the withdrawal of Polish 1st Rifle battalion and National Defence battalion Czersk from the nearby battle of Chojnice.

The Polish cavalry charge impressed the Germans and caused a delay in the offensive of the German 20th Motorised Infantry Division which considered a tactical retreat. This was however prevented by personal intervention of Gen. Guderian, who in his memoirs stated that he encountered his staff "wearing helmets, preparing an anti-tank gun for a possible Polish cavalry attack," and that "the panic of the first day of war was overcome quickly".

Aftermath and myth 

The Polish cavalry charge stopped the German pursuit for the day, and the units of Czersk Operational Group were able to withdraw southwards unopposed. Also, it took the Germans several hours to reorganise and continue the advance. On 2 September 1939 the 18th Pomeranian Uhlans Regiment was decorated by Gen. Stanisław Grzmot-Skotnicki, the commander of the Operational Group, with his own Virtuti Militari medal for valour shown in combat.

The same day, German war correspondents were brought to the battlefield, together with two journalists from Italy. They were shown the corpses of Polish cavalrymen and their horses as well as German tanks that had arrived at the place after the battle. One of the Italian correspondents, Indro Montanelli, sent home an article, in which he described the bravery and heroism of Polish soldiers, who charged German tanks with sabres and lances. Although such a charge did not happen, and there were no tanks used during combat, the myth was used by German propaganda during the war. German propaganda magazine Die Wehrmacht reported on 13 September that the Poles had gravely underestimated German weapons, as Polish propaganda had suggested that German armoured vehicles were covered only with a sheet metal, which led to a grotesque attack.

After World War II ended, the myth was still used by Soviet propaganda as an example of stupidity of prewar Polish commanders, who allegedly did not prepare their country for the war but wasted their soldiers' blood. As late as the 1990s, the myth was still being taught in history classes in some high schools and colleges.

One writer said:

The Poles had anti-tank weapons including the anti-tank rifle model 1935 7.92 mm (Wz. 35 anti-tank rifle). It could penetrate 15 mm of armour at 300 m at 30 degrees. In 1939, the Germans were equipped mainly with the small Panzer I and Panzer II models, which were vulnerable to such weapons.

See also 

 List of World War II military equipment of Poland
 List of German military equipment of World War II

References

Bibliography 
 .
 .

Further reading 
 .

External links
 .
 .  Detailed account of the battle.
 .

Krojanty
Polish cavalry
Krojanty
Pomeranian Voivodeship (1919–1939)
September 1939 events